The 1990 UMass Minutemen football team represented the University of Massachusetts Amherst in the 1990 NCAA Division I-AA football season as a member of the Yankee Conference. The team was coached by Jim Reid and played its home games at Warren McGuirk Alumni Stadium in Hadley, Massachusetts. The Minutemen made their second playoff appearance in three years, but would lose in the first round to future conference foe William & Mary. It would be the last playoff appearance for UMass until the 1998 National Championship season. UMass finished the season with a record of 8–2–1 overall and 7–1 in conference play.

Schedule

References

UMass
UMass Minutemen football seasons
Yankee Conference football champion seasons
UMass Minutemen football